Another Son was the second full-length album and final recording by Four to the Bar, released in 1995.

The album was a radical departure from their first, 1994's Craic on the Road.

The band is listed as producing the album. Engineer Tim Hatfield has also been credited with playing a significant role in the success of the record.

Track listing 

"The Newry Highwayman" (Traditional)
"Another Son" (Kelleher)
"The Western Shore" (Clifford)
"Shelli Sullivan's/Passing My Time/Marie Harvey's Delight" (O'Neill)
"NY's for Paddy" (Yeates)
"Something's Come In" (Kelleher)
"Catch the Wind" (Donovan)
"The World Turned Upside-Down" (Rosselson)
"The Shores of America" (Kelleher)
"The Old Men Admiring Themselves in the Water" (W.B. Yeats (lyrics); Clifford (music))
"Skibbereen" (Traditional)
"Getting Medieval" (Traditional)
"No Matter Where You Go" (Kelleher)

Personnel

David Yeates: Vocals, bodhran, flute, tin whistle, percussion
Martin Kelleher: Guitar, bouzouki, five-string banjo, backing vocals
Patrick Clifford: Bass guitar, piano, electric guitar
Keith O'Neill: Fiddle, tenor banjo

Production
Produced by Four to the Bar
Engineered by Tim Hatfield
Recorded at O'Neill's Irish Castle, Poughkeepsie, NY
Mixed at Mastermix Recording, New York, NY
Mastered at Steller Productions, New York, NY
Manufactured and printed by Disc Makers, USA

External links
Another Son Release Party Program
Winick, Steve, Review of Another Son, Dirty Linen Magazine, February/March 1996 (Issue #62)
Review of Another Son, Rock 'n' Reel Magazine
Four to the Bar official web site

1995 albums
Four to the Bar albums